This is a list of current and former North Macedonian intelligence agencies.

Currently active

  Military Service for Security and Intelligence-G2 (MSSI) (Military Agency)
  Administration for Security and Counterintelligence (ASC) (Police Agency)
  Intelligence Agency (IA) (Civilian Agency)

Former agencies (Yugoslavia)

  Department of National Security security agency
  State Security Administration secret police
  Counterintelligence Service military counterintelligence service 1941-1991

See also
 List of intelligence agencies
 List of Collaborators with Communist Security Agency

References

Intelligence
North Macedonia